During the 1990 heat wave in the United Kingdom a weather station recorded a temperature of  for Cheltenham, Gloucestershire, the highest temperature ever known in Britain, one full Fahrenheit degree above the previous record, set in 1911.

Impact 
Moorland fires were common during the height of the heat wave, occurring in North Yorkshire and the Peak District. Some  of the Peak District was closed to the public to try to prevent further fires occurring from careless visitors. Roads were clogged as people flocked to the coast and to holiday resorts throughout the country. Transport was further hampered as train services around the country slowed due to concerns over anomalies in the railway network from the intense heat. Reservoir levels fell, although the Water Services Association assured the public that "most people are still getting their full supply of water without any restrictions at all."

Statistics

See also 
 Heat waves
 Drought
 Drought in the United Kingdom

References

External links 
 

Heat waves in the United Kingdom
Heat wave
United Kingdom Heat Wave, 1990
United Kingdom Heat Wave, 1990
1990 heat waves
August 1990 events in the United Kingdom